

Jakob Wassermann (10 March 1873 – 1 January 1934) was a German writer and novelist.

Life 
Born in Fürth, Wassermann was the son of a shopkeeper and lost his mother at an early age. He showed literary interest early and published various pieces in small newspapers. Because his father was reluctant to support his literary ambitions, he began a short-lived apprenticeship with a businessman in Vienna after graduation.

He completed his military service in Würzburg. Afterward, he stayed in southern Germany and in Zurich. In 1894 he moved to Munich. Here he worked as a secretary and later as a copy editor at the paper Simplicissimus. Around this time he also became acquainted with other writers such as Rainer Maria Rilke, Hugo von Hofmannsthal, and Thomas Mann.

In 1896 he released his first novel, Melusine (his surname means "water-man" in German, while a "Melusine" (or "Melusina") is a figure of European legends and folklore, a feminine spirit of fresh waters in sacred springs and rivers).

From 1898 he was a theater critic in Vienna. In 1901 he married Julie Speyer, whom he divorced in 1915. Three years later he was married again to Marta Karlweis.

After 1906, he alternated between Vienna and Altaussee in Styria.

In 1926, he was elected to the Prussian Academy of Arts. He resigned in 1933, narrowly avoiding expulsion by the Nazis. In the same year, his books were banned in Germany owing to his Jewish ancestry.

He died on 1 January 1934 at his home in Altaussee of a heart attack.

Wassermann's work includes poetry, essays, novels, and short stories. His most important works are considered the novel The Maurizius Case (Der Fall Maurizius, 1928) and the autobiography, My Life as German and Jew (Mein Weg als Deutscher und Jude, 1921), in which he discussed the tense relationship between his German and Jewish identities.

Works 

 Melusine (Novel, 1896)
 Die Juden von Zirndorf (English title: The Dark Pilgrimage)  (Novel, 1897)
 Schläfst du, Mutter? (Novella, 1897)
 Die Geschichte der jungen Renate Fuchs (Novel, 1900)
 Der Moloch (Novel, 1902)
 Der niegeküsste Mund (Stories, 1903)
 Die Kunst der Erzählung (Essay, 1904)
 Alexander von Babylon (Novel, 1905)
 Donna Johanna von Castilien (Narrative, 1906)
 Die Schwestern (Novellas - Donna Johanna von Castilien, Sara Malcolm, Clarissa Mirabel  - 1906)
 Caspar Hauser oder Die Trägheit des Herzens (Novel, 1908)
 Die Gefangenen auf der Plassenburg (Narrative, 1909)
 Die Masken Erwin Reiners (1910)
 Der goldene Spiegel (Novella, 1911)
 Geronimo de Aguilar (Story, 1911)
 Faustina (Narrative, 1912)
 Der Mann von vierzig Jahren (Novel, 1913)
 Das Gänsemännchen (Novel, 1915)
 Christian Wahnschaffe (Novel, 1919) (English translation under the title: The World's Illusion)
 Die Prinzessin Girnara, Weltspiel und Legende (Play, 1919, libretto for the Wellesz opera Die Prinzessin Girnara)
 "Golowin" (Novel, 1920)
 Mein Weg als Deutscher und Jude (Autobiography, 1921)
 Imaginäre Brücken (Studies and Essays, 1921)
 Sturreganz (Narrative, 1922)
 Ulrike Woytich (Novel, 1923)
 Faber, oder die verlorenen Jahre (Novel, 1924)
 Laudin und die Seinen (Novel, 1925)
 Das Amulett (Novella, 1926)
 Der Aufruhr um den Junker Ernst (Novella, 1926)
 Das Gold von Caxamalca (Stories, 1928)
 Christoph Columbus (Biography, 1929
 Selbstbetrachtungen (Reflections, 1931)
 Novel trilogy:
 Der Fall Maurizius (The Maurizius Case) (1928)
 Etzel Andergast (published in the U.S. as "Dr. Kerkhoven") (1931)
 Joseph Kerkhovens dritte Existenz (1934)

Filmography
Christian Wahnschaffe, directed by Urban Gad (1920, based on the novel Christian Wahnschaffe)
The Masks of the Devil, directed by Victor Sjöström (1928, based on the novel Die Masken Erwin Reiners)
On Trial (L'affaire Maurizius), directed by Julien Duvivier (1954, based on the novel Der Fall Maurizius)
, directed by Anton Giulio Majano (1961, TV miniseries, based on the novel Der Fall Maurizius)

Notes

References 
 John Carl Blankenagel: The writings of Jakob Wassermann. Boston, The Christopher publishing house, 1942.
 Henry Miller: Reflections on The Maurizius case: a humble appraisal of a great book. Santa Barbara, Calif.: Capra Press, 1974.
 Alice Cohn Hanberg: The humanism of Jakob Wassermann. Thesis-University of California. Microfilm. Los Angeles, University of California, Library Photographic Service, 1953.
 Stephen H. Garrin: The concept of justice in Jakob Wassermann’s trilogy. Bern: Lang, 1979.

External links 
 
 
 
 Guide to the Jakob Wassermann Autographs Collection at the Leo Baeck Institute, New York.
 

Jewish German writers
20th-century German novelists
German expatriates in Austria
People from Fürth
1873 births
1934 deaths
German male novelists
20th-century German male writers